Caleb Joaquin Taylor (born 14 January 2003) is an English footballer who plays as a defender for Cheltenham Town on loan from  club West Bromwich Albion.

Career
Taylor joined West Bromwich Albion's academy at under-10 level. Taylor was named in their matchday squad for the first time on 9 May 2021 for a 3–1 defeat to Arsenal. On 25 August 2021, Taylor made his debut, starting in a 6–0 defeat against Arsenal. After Robert Snodgrass' substitution in the 74th minute, Taylor was given the captains armband, captaining the side until his substitution in the 82nd minute.

On 22 July 2022, Taylor joined EFL League One club Cheltenham Town on a season-long loan deal. Taylor made his debut for the Robins on 30 July 2022 coming on as a sub in the 75th minute against Peterborough United in a 3–2 defeat.

Personal life
He is the son of former Birmingham City defender Martin Taylor.

Career statistics

Honours 
West Bromwich Albion U23

 Premier League Cup winner: 2021–22

References

External links

Living people
2003 births
English footballers
Association football defenders
West Bromwich Albion F.C. players
Cheltenham Town F.C. players
English Football League players